Knopf may refer to:

Alfred A. Knopf, a New York publishing house co-founded by:
Alfred A. Knopf Sr. (1892–1984)
Blanche Knopf (1894–1966)
Knopf (surname), including a list of people with the name

See also